Maria Arena Bell (born March 10, 1963) is an American novelist, television and freelance writer. She is the former head writer and executive producer of the CBS Daytime soap opera The Young and the Restless.

Biography
Maria Arena Bell grew up in Newport Beach, California. She received a Bachelor of Arts degree in Art History from Northwestern University and did post graduate work in 19th Century Art. She began her career as a fashion designer for a major Los Angeles based garment manufacturer. In 1988, writer William J. Bell hired Maria Arena for the soap opera The Bold and the Beautiful (1987). There, she created the character of Sally Spectra who was loosely based on her step-father who worked in the Los Angeles garment industry.

After leaving The Bold and the Beautiful, Maria Arena Bell developed television formats for CBS and NBC. She also worked as an essayist for publications such as "T" the New York Times Style Magazine, "C" Magazine, Aspen Magazine, and Aspen Peak Magazine

Bell returned to daytime television in December 2007 and was ultimately named sole head writer and became one of the show's executive producers alongside Paul Rauch. In 2011, she was awarded a Daytime Emmy Award alongside her writing team, in addition to a total of six nominations as writer and producer on the show. After her departure from The Young and the Restless, Bell founded the production company Vitameatavegamin Productions. She is a professor at Harvard University in their Extension Program. She is involved philanthropically in arts education organizations and is the former chair of PS Arts, The Museum of Contemporary Art and for a decade Americans For The Arts National Arts Awards and other organizations.

Credits
The Bold and the Beautiful (credited as Maria Arena)
 Script Writer: 1989–1992
Fashion Consultant: 1989

The Young and the Restless
 Script Writer: 1990-92
 Co-head writer: December 26, 2007 - April 21, 2008 (with Josh Griffith) (chose financial core status during the WGA strike)
 Head writer: April 22, 2008 – October 22, 2012 (with Hogan Sheffer: 7/15/08-10/22/12) (with Scott Hamner: 8/11/08-10/22/12) (with Josh Griffith: 10/11/12-10/22/12)
 Co-Executive Producer (with Paul Rauch: October 3, 2008 – May 10, 2011)
 Executive Producer May 11, 2011 – October 22, 2012

Personal life
Bell is married to Bill Bell Jr., the eldest son of Y&R creators William J. Bell and Lee Phillip Bell. They have two children.

Awards
The Young and the Restless writing team won the WGA Award for Best Daytime Serial in February 2010 and again in 2013 for work airing under Bell's tenure. In 2011, Bell, along with her writing team, won the Daytime Emmy Award for Outstanding Drama Series Writing Team.  In December 2012 Bell was honored with the Women's Image Network Humanitarian Award for her contributions to arts and arts education.

References

External links
TV Profile

Living people
American soap opera writers
American people of Italian descent
American television producers
American women television producers
American women screenwriters
American screenwriters
Place of birth missing (living people)
1963 births
20th-century American women writers
Women soap opera writers
21st-century American women